Butlerov is a lunar impact crater that is located on the far side of the Moon, beyond the western limb and past the area sometimes brought into view through libration. It is located one crater diameter to the west of the crater Pease. Further to the west is the larger Kolhörster.

This is a regular crater formation with a nearly circular rim that has a slight outward bulge along the southern edge. A smaller crater is attached to the outside of the northwestern rim. The interior is somewhat rough, but lacks a central peak.

References

External links
 

Impact craters on the Moon